Oceanpress (Portuguese meaning "The Week") is a weekly newspaper published in the island of Sal, Cape Verde and is headquartered in Santa Maria.  It is the only newspaper in Sal.  Its slogan includes Noticias de Cabo Verde which also features national stories on paper and online.

The newspaper published its first number in 2014 making it the newest newspaper publication in the archipelago.

Contents 
Oceanpress features top stories as well as sports from the island and across and outside the archipelago, weather, businesses, arts and entertainment and more, from the island as well as from Cape Verde. It features pages about news stories, newspaper pictures and sports online.

See also 
 Newspapers in Cape Verde
 List of companies in Cape Verde

References

External links 
 Official website

Newspapers published in Cape Verde
Sal, Cape Verde
Santa Maria, Cape Verde
2014 establishments in Cape Verde